Jake Joseph Paul (born January 17, 1997) is an American social media personality and professional boxer. He initially rose to fame on Vine, before playing the role of Dirk Mann on the Disney Channel series Bizaardvark for two seasons. Throughout his career, Paul has become the subject of many controversies due to his behavior, including being charged with criminal trespass and unlawful assembly.

Paul's boxing career began in August 2018 when he defeated British YouTuber Deji Olatunji in an amateur contest via TKO in the fifth round. Turning professional, Paul beat the YouTuber AnEsonGib in January 2020, via TKO in the first round. Between 2020 and 2022, Paul won his following fights against retired basketballer Nate Robinson by second round KO as well as retired mixed martial artists Ben Askren, Tyron Woodley, and Anderson Silva by 1st-round TKO, twice by SD and 6th-round KO, and UD, respectively. Tommy Fury handed him his first professional loss via SD. 

In January 2023, he announced that he would be making his professional MMA debut with the PFL.

Early life
Paul was born in Cleveland, Ohio, and grew up in Westlake, Ohio, with his older brother Logan, who is also a YouTuber and internet personality. They started filming themselves when Jake was 10. Their parents are Pamela Ann Stepnick (née Meredith) and realtor Gregory Allan Paul.

Entertainment career

2013–2016: Vine, YouTube and Bizaardvark 
Paul began his career in September 2013 posting videos on Vine. By the time Vine was discontinued by Twitter Inc., Paul had amassed 5.3 million followers and 2 billion views on the app. Paul launched his YouTube channel on May 15, 2014. His channel is known for pranks, controversies, and his hip hop music.

After gaining acclaim on Vine and YouTube, Paul was hired onto the set of the Disney Channel series Bizaardvark, playing a character who accepted dare requests that he would then perform. On July 22, 2017, during the middle of filming the second season of Bizaardvark, the Disney Channel announced that Paul would be leaving the series. The announcement followed a news report from KTLA about public complaints from Paul's neighbors regarding the noise generated by Paul's pranks, parties, fire hazards and the large crowds of Paul's fans congregating in their neighborhood. Paul later confirmed the news on his Twitter page, saying he would now focus more on his personal brand, his YouTube channel, his business ventures, and more adult acting roles. Paul later revealed in an interview with The Hollywood Reporter that he was actually fired from Bizaardvark by Disney, which wanted to expedite the process of weaning him off the show due to the KTLA segment.

2017–2018: Music and Team 10
Paul launched entertainment collective Team 10 in 2016. On January 17, 2017, his 20th birthday, it was reported that he had launched media company TeamDom with $1 million in financing to create an influencer marketing management and creative agency around teen entertainment. Investors included Danhua Capital, Horizons Alpha, Vayner Capital, Sound Ventures & A-Grade Investments and Adam Zeplain.

Paul released the single "It's Everyday Bro", featuring Team 10, alongside the music video, on May 30, 2017. It featured vocals from members of the team at the time, consisting of Nick Crompton, Chance Sutton, Ivan and Emilio Martinez and Tessa Brooks. It drew over 70 million views in one month and became the website's third most disliked video. The song debuted and peaked at number 91 on the Billboard Hot 100 and was certified platinum by the Recording Industry Association of America (RIAA). Its title refers to how Paul at the time posted a video every single day. In 2017, Paul released and later deleted singles including "Ohio Fried Chicken," "Jerika," "No Competition," "That Ain't on the News," and "Litmas." The singles were deleted for various reasons, including his 2018 break-up with Erika Costell.

On November 22, 2017, Paul released a remix of "It's Everyday Bro," featuring American rapper Gucci Mane in place of Team 10, alongside the new music video for it. On April 27, 2018, he released the single Malibu with now-former Team 10 member Chad Tepper, along with the music video. On May 11, he released another single, My Teachers, featuring now-former Team 10 members Sunny Malouf and Anthony Trujillo, along with the music video. On May 24, he released two singles, Randy Savage and Cartier Vision. The former song features Team 10 and hip-hop duo Jitt & Quan, featuring vocals from Team 10 members at the time, consisting of Anthony Trujillo, Sunny Malouf, Justin Roberts, Erika Costell, and Chad Tepper; it was released along with the music video. The latter song features Anthony and the duo as well; the music video was released later on September 12.

On August 15, 2018, Paul released another single titled "Champion," with a music video. The song was a diss track towards Paul's boxing opponent Deji Olatunji (ComedyShortsGamer), the younger brother of British YouTube star, internet personality, boxer, and rapper KSI, in which their fight happened ten days later on August 25. Throughout the summer of 2018, Paul and Team 10 went on a tour in North America, performing songs. Gradually, the Team 10 members all left one by one from the beginning of the year until the end.

Paul was ranked in second place in Forbes''' list of highest-paid YouTubers in 2018.

2019: Business enterprises and new group
On March 1, 2019, Paul released the single "I'm Single", which was released along with the music video. The song focused on Paul's feelings about being single and his breakup with Erika Costell. As the social media accounts for Team 10 have been inactive since September 2019, some assumed that Team 10 had disbanded and Paul had formed a new team. On December 13, 2019, Paul released another single "These Days", but deleted it from streaming services less than a year later.

2020–present: More focus on music
On July 24, 2020, Paul released the single "Fresh Outta London", which was released alongside the music video. For the video shoot, he threw a party at his home in Calabasas, California thirteen days before, on July 11, in which he garnered national attention after being criticised by Calabasas mayor Alicia Weintraub after videos and pictures of the party surfaced online. On September 10, Paul released another single titled "23", alongside a music video at his house, which only starred his older brother Logan and also featured clips of him and a few of his friends. The title of the song refers to his age at the time, as well as American former basketball player Michael Jordan's jersey number. On October 15, Paul released the single "Dummy", featuring Canadian rapper TVGucci, who is signed to fellow Canadian rapper Drake's record label, OVO Sound. The lyric video was published on Paul's YouTube channel six days later, on October 21.

 2021–present: Sports business 
In 2021 Paul founded an organization named ‘Boxing Bullies’ to help the youth combat bullying.

Paul started venture capital branded as the 'Anti Fund' in 2021 with serial entrepreneur Geoffrey Woo. It enables investors and fans to raise money through a quarterly subscription by using Angel List's Rolling Funds platform. Later, Anti Fund led investment in sports gambling firm Simplebet Inc. raising $30 million in a financing round in August 2021.

Paul founded 'Most Valuable Promotions' (MVP) with his adviser, Nakisa Bidarian in 2021 and signed Amanda Serrano to a promotional deal in September 2021.

In May 2022, Paul featured on the Forbes list for the highest paid athletes in 2022. Forbes estimated that Paul made $38 million from his three boxing bouts, and various other income streams, in the period.

In August 2022, Paul founded a sports-media and mobile-betting company, "Betr", alongside Simplebet founder Joey Levy. Paul claims to have received $50 million in series-A funding for this venture.

In January 2023, Paul signed a multiyear contract with the Professional Fighters League to cofound and compete in a new pay-per-view division, known as Super Fight, as well as adopt the official role of “head of fighter advocacy.”

Boxing career

 Amateur career 

 Paul vs. Deji 

On August 25, 2018, Jake Paul and his brother Logan Paul fought KSI and his younger brother, Deji Olatunji, in a pair of amateur white-collar boxing matches. Jake Paul's fight against Deji was the chief undercard bout before the main event, KSI vs. Logan Paul. Paul defeated Deji via technical knockout in the fifth round.

 Professional career 

 Paul vs. AnEsonGib 
On December 21, 2019, it was announced that Paul would be making his professional boxing debut against the YouTuber AnEsonGib (known as Gib) on January 30, 2020, in Miami. The match between Paul and Gib was the co-feature to the WBO world middleweight title bout between professional boxers Demetrius Andrade and Luke Keeler. Paul won the fight via TKO at 2:18 in the first round.

 Paul vs. Robinson 

In July 2020, it was announced that Jake Paul would be venturing into the ring for a second professional bout, facing professional basketball player Nate Robinson as part of the undercard for the Mike Tyson vs. Roy Jones Jr. exhibition match. The event was initially scheduled for September 12 at the Dignity Health Sports Park in Carson, California; however, in August, Tyson revealed the event had been pushed back to November 28 to maximize revenue. Paul won the fight via KO at 1:24 in the second round.

 Paul vs. Askren 

After a back-and-forth on social media, it was announced on December 22, 2020, that Paul's third pro bout opponent would be the former Bellator MMA and ONE Welterweight Champion Ben Askren, on March 28, 2021, in Los Angeles. After Askren accepted Paul's challenge, rumors of a proposed March 28 date in Los Angeles started circulating. On February 26, 2021, it was announced that the fight would be held on April 17 in Atlanta. Paul defeated Askren via TKO at 1:59 in round 1. The event reportedly made 1.45 million pay-per-view buys as per Triller, however, the legitimacy of both the match and the numbers of the event have been heavily questioned by multiple personalities, fans, MMA fighters and boxers alike.

Paul vs. Woodley

Before the Jake Paul vs. Ben Askren main event took place, Paul and one of his cornermen J'Leon Love were involved in a backstage confrontation with former UFC Welterweight Champion Tyron Woodley, where Woodley was mocked due to his inexperience in boxing and the result of Paul's bout against Woodley's long–time teammate Ben Askren was discussed. After knocking out Askren, Paul was called out by Woodley. On May 31, 2021, news surfaced that Paul was scheduled to face Woodley in a boxing bout on August 29, 2021. He won the fight by split decision. One judge scored the fight 77–75 for Woodley, while the other two judges scored it 77–75 and 78–74 in favor of Paul.

 Paul vs. Woodley II 

Tommy Fury was originally scheduled to fight Paul, but pulled out of the bout due to medical issues. It was announced that Tyron Woodley would replace Fury in the fight, a rematch of their previous bout in Ohio back in August. The pair fought the rematch in Tampa, Florida on December 18, 2021.

Paul defeated Woodley via KO at 2:12 of the 6th round. At the time of the stoppage, Paul was winning the bout with the scores of 49–46 (twice) and 48–46. The knockout was awarded KO of the year by both DAZN and ESPN.

 Paul vs. Silva 

On September 6, 2022, a fight between Paul and former UFC champion Anderson Silva was announced for October 29, it being contested at 187 pounds over eight three-minute rounds. Paul defeated Silva by unanimous decision with scores of 78–73 (twice) and 77–74.
Paul vs Fury

On January 27, 2023, it was announced that Jake Paul would face Tommy Fury on February 26 in Saudi Arabia. On the night of the fight, Paul lost via split decision, despite knocking Fury down in the 8th round. One judge scored it 75–74 to Paul, while the other two judges had it 76–73 to Fury.

 Cancelled bouts 

 Paul vs. Rahman Jr. 

Tommy Fury was originally scheduled to fight Paul again, but pulled out of the bout due to travel issues. It was announced on July 7 that Hasim Rahman Jr. would replace Fury in the fight. The fight was set for August 6, 2022, at the Madison Square Garden in New York City, New York. On July 30, it was announced that the bout would be cancelled due to "weight-issues" and that all sales towards the fight would be refunded.

 Mixed martial arts career 
 Professional Fighter League 
On January 5, 2023, it was announced that Paul had signed a multi-year deal with the Professional Fighters League. Paul began training Brazilian jiu-jitsu in anticipation of his MMA debut with ADCC head organizer Mo Jassim and ATOS BJJ black belt Michael Perez.

Controversies and legal issues

 Content controversies 
On January 3, 2018, Paul uploaded a video to his YouTube channel titled "I lost my virginity" which used a thumbnail of himself and his then-girlfriend Erika Costell posing semi-nude on top of each other. The video was age-restricted by YouTube as a result, and critics such as Keemstar criticized the thumbnail as being inappropriate for his younger audience. The thumbnail was later changed with both Paul and Costell fully clothed and not touching each other. Two days later, on January 5, TMZ revealed a video in which Paul used the racial epithet "nigga" multiple times while freestyle rapping.

On November 29, 2020, Paul sparked frustration after stating he paved the way for content house creation and boxing matches between high-profile social media stars. Many objected to Paul's claim, observing that he did not create the first content house, nor was he the first YouTube star to fight in a boxing match.

 Scam allegations 
On January 3, 2018, Paul started the website Edfluence, a program claiming to teach younger people how to be successful, learn life skills, and earn money online. The course cost US$7 per user, which would allow the user to unlock a series of videos for a "roadmap" to success as an influencer. However, the seven dollars did not unlock the entire program, but only gave a few basic tips. Paul also promised his audience that if they joined the course, they would get to join "Team 1000", which did not happen. Following the situation, Paul was accused of scamming young followers and stealing their money. Then, two years later, on January 31, 2020, Edfluence was shut down, which stopped the course permanently. On February 15, Paul announced that he would partner with Los Angeles-based brand development group GenZ Holdings Inc. to create a $19.99-per-month platform aimed at teaching children how to build an online presence. "The Financial Freedom Movement" promises to give subscribers access to "Jake Paul’s personal experience, rituals and secret formula" and "cutting edge mentorship, coaching, and training". The program has been criticized by some, with one interviewer questioning whether it would send a dangerous message to his young fanbase.

On January 3, 2019, Paul, along with fellow YouTuber RiceGum, came under fire for promoting MysteryBrand, a website that offers the chance to open a digital "mystery box" of pre-selected items with a promise to win one in real life at random. Many users have said they have not received prizes they won through the site.

On February 18, 2022, in a class-action lawsuit filed against the cryptocurrency company SafeMoon that alleged the company is a pump and dump scheme, Paul was named as a defendant along with musician Nick Carter, rappers Soulja Boy and Lil Yachty, and social media personality Ben Phillips for promoting the SafeMoon token on their social media accounts with misleading information as part of the 2022 Safemoon fraud allegations. On the same day, the U.S. 11th Circuit Court of Appeals ruled in a lawsuit against Bitconnect that the Securities Act of 1933 extends to targeted solicitation using social media. In March 2022, YouTuber Coffeezilla uploaded a video in which he accused Paul of using cryptocurrency and non-fungible tokens to scam his fans out of $2.2 million.

Party complaints, public nuisance lawsuits, and COVID-19
In addition to the 2017 public complaints that eventually led to Paul's dismissal from Bizaardvark, Paul's neighbors in the Beverly Grove neighborhood of Los Angeles filed a class-action public nuisance lawsuit against Paul. This came after Paul made his home address public, leading crowds of fans to gather outside Paul's residence, and noise complaints by neighbors.Wolfe, Chris (July 17, 2017). "In Beverly Grove, Social Media Star Jake Paul’s Antics Stir Up The Neighborhood" . KTLA (Los Angeles). On April 24, 2018, it was reported that Paul was being sued by Cobra Acquisitions, the company that owns the house, for $2.5 million.

On February 23, 2020, in Las Vegas, Nevada, Paul was involved in an altercation with British singer Zayn Malik at Westgate, the hotel near the MGM Grand Garden Arena at which the two were staying. Paul and Malik's rooms were right across from each other and when Paul's older brother, Logan, went to Paul's hotel room, an argument broke out between Malik and Paul because Paul believed Malik was using a rude tone. Following the interaction, Paul posted about it on Twitter, which drew attention from Malik's girlfriend and American model Gigi Hadid. Paul later deleted his tweets which criticized Malik and then posted another tweet stating that he tweeted about the incident since he was drunk, acknowledging the fact in a tweet later in the day, writing, "someone needs to take my phone when i'm drunk because I am a fucking idiot". Logan released the video footage on the 161st episode of his podcast, Impaulsive, in which he explained the whole situation.

On July 11, 2020, Paul threw a large party at his home in Calabasas, California, despite the ongoing COVID-19 pandemic. Dozens of people attended without wearing masks and maintaining social distancing. After complaints from neighbors and videos surfaced on social media, Calabasas mayor Alicia Weintraub expressed outrage, saying, "They're having this large party, no social distancing, no masks, it’s just a big huge disregard for everything that everybody is trying to do to get things back to functioning." She continued, saying, "It's really just a party acting like COVID does not exist, it's acting that businesses aren't closed". She later added that the city was looking into "all of our options" regarding penalties for Paul and the attendees of the party.

On November 25, 2020, Paul attracted further COVID-related controversy due to statements in an interview with The Daily Beast. When interviewer Marlow Stern asked Paul if he regretted his words and actions regarding the July 11 party, Paul responded by saying that COVID-19 was a "hoax", also stating that "98 percent of news [about COVID-19] is fake", and that he believed the measures against COVID-19 in the United States should end, calling them "the most detrimental thing to our society." He then incorrectly stated that the flu had killed as many people in the United States in 2020 as COVID-19 did, and claimed that "Medical professionals have [recently] also said that masks do absolutely nothing to prevent the spread of coronavirus"; he later referred to said professionals as "dozens of my medical friends." When Stern tried to question his claims, Paul told Stern "You're arrogant. You're very arrogant", "you want clickbait", and "I've never even heard of you." The interview sparked condemnation from various individuals and media outlets, such as Page Six, and fellow YouTuber Tyler Oakley, who called Paul "aggressively ignorant" and "embarrassing."

Attending a riot at an Arizona mall and FBI raid
On May 30, 2020, Paul and a few of his friends came to have dinner at P. F. Chang's outside of Scottsdale Fashion Square in Scottsdale, Arizona, as part of the George Floyd protests, where it escalated quickly and people began looting the mall. Multiple instances of footage show Paul and his friends outside of a P. F. Chang's witnessing the riot and they made their way inside the mall where they documented the incident. People on social media criticized Paul for entering the mall and standing in the middle of the mall witnessing people looting stores. Paul later apologized on social media condemning the violence, and also denied the accusations of looting, instead saying he was filming as a public service for a future video. Paul said, "We filmed everything we saw in an effort to share our experience and bring more attention to the anger felt in every neighborhood we travelled through; we were strictly documenting, not engaging." On June 4, 2020, Paul was charged with criminal trespass and unlawful assembly, both misdemeanor charges, for being in the mall during the riot. On August 5, 2020, Paul's Calabasas mansion was raided by the Federal Bureau of Investigation (FBI). In a statement to the Los Angeles Times the FBI stated, "The FBI is executing a federal search warrant at a residence in Calabasas in connection with an ongoing investigation." On the same day, the charges were dismissed without prejudice, the Scottsdale Police Department said it was "in the best interest of the community" and would allow a federal criminal investigation to be completed. Paul also explained in a now-deleted video that the raid was "completely related to the looting controversy". In August 2021 it was reported Paul would not face federal charges over the incident.

 Sexual assault allegations 
On April 9, 2021, a video was released by TikTok personality Justine Paradise who alleged that Paul forced her into oral sex and touched her without her consent during an incident at the Team 10 House in 2019. Paul responded to the accusations, saying, "Sexual assault accusations aren't something that I, or anyone should ever take lightly, but to be crystal clear, this claim made against me is 100% false."  In a later video Paradise stated she received harassment and death threats over the accusation.

On April 22, 2021, an article about Paul in The New York Times featured a second accusation by model and actress Railey Lollie. Lollie, who had started working for Paul at 17, alleged that Paul would call her "jailbait", and at one point groped her.

Investigation in Puerto Rico
On May 15, 2021, Paul was investigated by the Puerto Rico Department of Natural and Environmental Resources for riding a motorized vehicle on Puerto Rico's beaches, seen on a video that was posted online but then removed. It is illegal to ride motorized vehicles on Puerto Rico's beaches in order to protect natural wildlife such as sea turtles. Paul apologized stating he had intended no harm.

Personal life

Paul has English, Irish, Scottish, Welsh, Jewish, French and German ancestry. Paul has a net worth of approximately $17–30 million. In January 2022, Forbes announced that Paul made approximately $38 million from boxing in 2021, making him the 46th highest paid athlete in the world for that period.

Paul began dating fellow American YouTuber and internet personality Tana Mongeau in April 2019. In June 2019, the couple announced that they were engaged, although many fans and commentators did not believe that the engagement was legitimate. On July 28 of that year, Paul and Mongeau exchanged vows in Las Vegas. InTouch later reported that the couple had not obtained a marriage license prior to the ceremony and that the officiant was also not licensed by the state of Nevada. As a result, the marriage was not legally binding. Buzzfeed reported that Paul and Mongeau left the ceremony separately. The ceremony, which was available on pay-per-view for $50, was recorded by MTV for the show No Filter: Tana Mongeau. On an episode of the show, Mongeau stated that the ceremony was something "fun and lighthearted that we're obviously doing for fun and for content." The couple announced their break-up in January 2020.

Boxing record
Professional

Amateur

Honorary titles
WBC Amateur Champion 
Triller Fight Club Champion 
WBA Champion 

 Pay-per-view bouts 

Filmography

 Film 

 7Television 

 Web shows 

Discography
Extended plays

Singles

Bibliography
Paul, Jake. You Gotta Want It'', Gallery Books 2016 (memoir)

Awards and nominations

References

Further reading

External links

 
 

1997 births
21st-century American comedians
American male boxers
American conspiracy theorists
American male child actors
American male comedians
American male film actors
American male rappers
American male television actors
American people of English descent
American people of German-Jewish descent
American people of Irish descent
American people of Welsh descent
American TikTokers
American YouTubers
Boxers from Ohio
Cruiserweight boxers
YouTube boxers
Internet-related controversies
Living people
Male actors from Cleveland
Male bloggers
Mass media people from Ohio
Music YouTubers
Musicians from Cleveland
Rappers from Cleveland
Rappers from Ohio
Video bloggers
Vine (service) celebrities
YouTube controversies
People from Westlake, Ohio
American video bloggers